Bold Venture was a syndicated radio series starring Humphrey Bogart and Lauren Bacall that aired from 1951 to 1952. Morton Fine and David Friedkin scripted the taped series for Bogart's Santana Productions.

Synopsis 

Salty seadog Slate Shannon (Bogart) owns a Cuban hotel, Shannon's Place, sheltering an assortment of treasure hunters, revolutionaries, and other shady characters. With his sidekick and ward, the sultry Sailor Duval (Bacall), tagging along, he encounters modern-day pirates and other tough situations while navigating the waters around Havana. Aboard his boat, the Bold Venture, Slate and Sailor experience "adventure, intrigue, mystery and romance in the sultry settings of tropical Havana and the mysterious islands of the Caribbean."

Calypso singer King Moses (Jester Hairston) provided musical bridges by threading plot situations into the lyrics of his songs. Music for the series was by David Rose.

The series combined elements of a number of past Bogart/Bacall film collaborations, most notably To Have and Have Not which also cast Bogart as a boat owner in the Caribbean who reluctantly becomes involved in intrigue while romancing Bacall. The relationship between Shannon and King Moses, and his ownership of an inn, is strongly reminiscent of the dynamic between Rick Blaine and Sam in Casablanca.

Production 

Beginning in March 1951, the Frederic W. Ziv Company syndicated 78 episodes via electrical transcription. Some sources have claimed that the 78 episodes include reruns, and that there were only around 30 episodes but more than 50 shows have now come to light. Heard on 423 stations, the 30-minute series earned $5,000 weekly for Bogart and Bacall.

57 episodes are now known to exist, some are known by more than one title which can make it appear that there are more.

Radio episode guide

Television 
Ziv brought Bold Venture to television in 1959 with 39 episodes directed by William Conrad. The series starred Dane Clark as Slate Shannon, Joan Marshall as Sailor Duval, and Bernie Gozier as King Moses. Mark Dana played Philip Keith Baker, Lisa Gaye played Leta, and Karen Scott played Tina. Morton Fine and David Friedkin were the producers.

Because of unstable conditions in Cuba, the setting was changed to Trinidad. Filming locations included the Iverson Movie Ranch in Chatsworth, California.

Listen to 

 Episodes of Bold Venture 
 Bold Venture on Way Back When
 Bold Venture (57 episodes)
 Radio Lovers: Bold Ventures (20 episodes)
 Internet Archive: Bold Venture (57 episodes)

References

External links 
 The Definitive: Bold Venture article and log
 Old Time Radio Researchers Bold Venture wiki
 Dick Judge's Bold Venture log
 Fred Ziv and Bold Venture
 

1959 American television series debuts
1959 American television series endings
1950s American radio programs
1950s American drama television series
American radio dramas
Black-and-white American television shows
English-language television shows
First-run syndicated television programs in the United States
Television series by Ziv Television Programs
Ziv Company radio programs
Syndicated radio programs